Thanchi is an upazila of Bandarban District in the Division of Chittagong, Bangladesh.

Geography
It has 2,885 households and a total area of 1020.82 km2.

At the boundary with Ali Kadam Upazila, the  Alikadam-Thanchi Road ascends hill Dim Pahar, making it one of the highest motorable roads in Bangladesh.

Demographics
According to the 1991 Bangladesh census, Thanchi has a population of 16104. Males constituted 55.61% of the population, and females 44.39%. The population aged 18 or over was 8,639. Thanchi had an average literacy rate of 17.4% (7+ years), against the national average of 32.4%.

Administration
Thanchi Upazila is divided into four union parishads: Balipara, Remakry, Thanchi, and Tindu. The union parishads are subdivided into 12 mauzas and 178 villages.

Gallery

See also
Upazilas of Bangladesh
Districts of Bangladesh
Divisions of Bangladesh

References

External links
 Thanchi Upazila: About, Map, & Attractive Places! (EduGovBD)

Upazilas of Bandarban District